Gabriel Morales (born June 21, 1984) is an American Major League Baseball (MLB) umpire. 

A native of Santa Clara, California, Morales began umpiring Minor League Baseball games in 2009. He made his debut in 2014, and was one of four umpires promoted to the full-time staff in February 2017, upon the retirements of Bob Davidson, John Hirschbeck, Jim Joyce, and Tim Welke.

During the decisive game five of the 2021 National League Division Series between the San Francisco Giants and Los Angeles Dodgers on October 14, 2021, Morales ruled that Giants' batter Wilmer Flores had swung on a pitch, which resulted in a strikeout, ending the game and the series. The call was criticized, as replays appeared to show that Flores had checked his swing. After the game he said, "I don't have the benefit of multiple camera angles when I'm watching it live. When it happened live, I thought he went."

References

External links

1984 births
Living people
Sportspeople from Santa Clara, California
Major League Baseball umpires
Santa Teresa High School alumni
Major League Baseball controversies